The discography of L'Arc-en-Ciel, a rock band from Osaka, Japan, formed in 1991. The group has sold over 13 million albums, 16 million singles, and millions of merchandise, including home videos. In 2003, L'Arc-en-Ciel were ranked 58 on HMV Japan's list of the top 100 Japanese pop artists.

Albums

Studio albums

Repackaged albums

Live albums

Compilation albums

Remix albums

Singles

Limited digital download songs

Filmography

VHS, DVD, and Blu-ray (BD)

References

Discographies of Japanese artists
Rock music group discographies